Astrophanes andinus is a species of bee flies (insects in the family Bombyliidae).

Distribution
Argentina.

References

Bombyliidae
Insects described in 1909
Taxa named by Juan Brèthes
Diptera of South America
Endemic fauna of Argentina